Koiak 15 - Coptic Calendar - Koiak 17

The sixteenth day of the Coptic month of Koiak, the fourth month of the Coptic year. On a common year, this day corresponds to December 12, of the Julian Calendar, and December 25 of the Gregorian Calendar. This day falls in the Coptic season of Peret, the season of emergence. This day falls in the Nativity Fast.

Commemorations

Saints 

 The departure of the Righteous Gideon, the Judge of Israel 
 The martyrdom of Saints Harouadj, Ananias, and Khouzi 
 The martyrdom of Saints Eulogius and Arsanius, the patron Saints of Al-Hadid Monastery 
 The martyrdom of Saint Amash of Qift

Other commemorations 

 The consecration of the Church of Saint James the Persian

References 

Days of the Coptic calendar